Aksaray is a village in the Dashoguz region of Turkmenistan.

Geography 
Aksaray is located about 20 km south of Görogly.

Site 
The place is noted for Aksaray Ding — an "unusual" fired brick structure.

References 

Populated places in Daşoguz Region